Satish Dhawan (25 September 1920 – 3 January 2002) was an Indian mathematician and aerospace engineer, widely regarded as the father of experimental fluid dynamics research in India. Born in Srinagar, Dhawan was educated in India and further on in United States. Dhawan was one of the most eminent researchers in the field of turbulence and boundary layers, leading the successful and indigenous development of the Indian space programme. He succeeded M. G. K. Menon, as the third chairman of the Indian Space Research Organisation (ISRO) in 1972.

Education 
Dhawan was a graduate of the University of the Punjab in Lahore, British India (now in Pakistan), where he completed a Bachelor of Science in physics and mathematics, a bachelor's degree in Mechanical Engineering and a Master of Arts in English literature. In 1947, he completed a Master of Science degree in aerospace engineering from the University of Minnesota, Minneapolis, and an aeronautical engineering degree from the California Institute of Technology followed by a double PhD in mathematics and aerospace engineering under the supervision of his advisor Hans W. Liepmann in 1951.

Leadership in space research 

In 1972, Dr Dhawan became chairman of the Indian Space Research Organisation (ISRO) and secretary to the Government of India at the Department of Space.

APJ Abdul Kalam explained that in 1979 when he was the director of a Satellite Launch Vehicle, the mission failed to launch the satellite in the orbit. Instead, it was put into Bay of Bengal. Abdul Kalam's team knew that there was a leakage in the fuel of the system, but they hoped that the leakage was negligible, and thus they thought there was enough fuel in the system. This miscalculation lead to the failure. Satish Dhawan, being the chairman at the time, called Abdul Kalam and conveyed to the press; "We failed! But I have very strong trust in my team and I believe that next time we will definitely succeed". This surprised Abdul Kalam, as the blame of the failure was taken by the chairman of ISRO. The next mission was prepared and launched successfully in 1980. When this succeeded, Satish Dhawan told Abdul Kalam to attend the press meet without his presence. It was observed that when the team failed, he took the blame. But when the team succeeded, he attributed the success to his team, thus portraying the picture of an ideal leader.

Satish Dhawan was chairman of ISRO until 1984.

Director, IISc (1962–1981) 
Dhawan joined as faculty at the Indian Institute of Science (IISc), Bangalore, in 1951 and became its director in 1962. Although he was the head of the Indian space programme, he devoted substantial efforts towards boundary layer research. His most important contributions are presented in the seminal book Boundary Layer Theory by Hermann Schlichting. He set up the country's first supersonic wind tunnel at IISc. He also pioneered research on relaminarization of separated boundary layer flows, three-dimensional boundary layers and trisonic flows.

Support of space research 
Dhawan carried out pioneering experiments in rural education, remote sensing and satellite communications. His efforts led to operational systems like INSAT, a telecommunications satellite; IRS, the Indian Remote Sensing satellite; and the Polar Satellite Launch Vehicle (PSLV), that placed India in the league of space faring nations.

Honours 
Dhawan died on 3 January 2002 in Bangalore. Following his death, the satellite launch centre at Sriharikota, Andhra Pradesh, located about 100 km north of Chennai in South India, was renamed to the Satish Dhawan Space Centre. Satish Chander Dhawan Government College For Boys in Ludhiana is named after him. Department of Mechanical Engineering Building at Indian Institute of Technology Ropar is also named after him as Satish Dhawan Block, IIT Ropar. Uttar Pradesh Textile Technology Institute Kanpur is also named as Prof SATISH Dhavan Computer Centre in year 2019

Career 
Indian Institute of Science, Bangalore
Senior Scientific Officer, 1951
Professor and Head of the Department of Aeronautical Engineering, 1955
Director, 1962–1981
California Institute of Technology, US
Visiting Professor, 1971–72
National Aerospace Laboratories, Bangalore
Chairman, Research council, 1984–93
Indian Academy of Sciences
President, 1977–1979
Indian Space Research Organisation
Chairman, 1972–1984
Indian Space Commission
Chairman, 1972–2002

Awards 
Padma Vibhushan (India's second highest civilian honour), 1981
Padma Bhushan (India's third highest civilian honour), 1971
Indira Gandhi Award for National Integration, 1999
Distinguished Alumnus Award, Indian Institute of Science
Distinguished Alumnus Award, California Institute of Technology, 1969

Personal life 
Satish Dhawan was born on 25 September 1920 in Srinagar in the state of Jammu and Kashmir, India, in a Saraiki Hindu family. His father came from Dera Ismail Khan, and Satish Dhawan grew up in Lahore and Kashmir. He was married to Nalini Dhawan, a cytogeneticist,  and his daughter Jyotsna Dhawan is serving as Senior Principal Scientist in the Centre for Cellular and Molecular Biology.

Works 
 1953: "Direct measurements of skin friction", Technical Report 1121, National Advisory Committee for Aeronautics, Washington DC.
 1958; "Some properties of boundary layer flow during the transition from laminar to turbulent motion", Journal of Fluid Mechanics 3(4): 418 – 36 
 1967: "Aeronautical Research in India", (22nd British Commonwealth Lecture),  Journal of the Royal Aeronautical Society 71: 149-184.
 1982: "A glimpse of fluid mechanics research in Bangalore 25 years ago", in India: Surveys in fluid mechanics, Indian Academy of Sciences (Eds. R Narasimha, S M Deshpande) 1-15.
 1988: Developments in Fluid Mechanics and Space Technology, (Eds. R Narasimha, APJ Abdul Kalam) Indian Academy of Sciences.
 1991: "Bird flight", Sadhana Proceedings in Engineering Sciences, Indian Academy of Sciences.
 2000: Special Section on Instabilities, transitions and turbulence, (Ed. R Narasimha) Current Science 79: 725-883.

References 

 P.A. Davidson, Y. Kaneda, K. Moffatt, and K.R. Sreenivasan (eds, 2011).  A Voyage Through Turbulence, chapter 11, pp 373–92, Cambridge University Press

External links 
 
 Bird Flight by Satish Dhawan (2nd edition, 2020)

1920 births
2002 deaths
California Institute of Technology alumni
Space programme of India
Recipients of the Padma Vibhushan in science & engineering
Indian Space Research Organisation people
University of Minnesota College of Science and Engineering alumni
Indian fluid dynamicists
Recipients of the Padma Bhushan in science & engineering
People from Srinagar
University of the Punjab alumni
Indian aerospace engineers
Directors of the Indian Institute of Science
Academic staff of the Indian Institute of Science
Recipients of the Padma Shri in science & engineering
20th-century Indian engineers
Engineers from Jammu and Kashmir
20th-century Indian physicists
Fluid dynamicists